Greg Carey (born April 5, 1990) is a Canadian professional ice hockey player, currently an unrestricted free agent. He most recently played under contract to the HC Pustertal Wölfe of the ICE Hockey League (ICEHL).

Playing career
Carey began playing junior hockey with the Burlington Cougars of the OJHL. After returning from a four-game suspension in 2009, Carey recorded five points in an 8–2 win over the Milton Icehawks to help the Cougars set a new franchise record for most wins. He was also selected for Team Canada East and the CCHL All Star Team.

After graduating from St. Thomas More Secondary School and going undrafted in the NHL Entry Draft, Carey played college hockey with the St. Lawrence Saints in the NCAA Men's Division I ECAC Hockey conference.

In his freshman season, Carey became the first rookie to lead the Saints in scoring since 1982 and was named to the ECAC All Rookie Team. He was also named the Saints Rookie of the Year. In his sophomore year, Carey tied for the Saints scoring leader but had led the team in goals.

In his junior year, Carey's outstanding plays were rewarded with a selection to the 2012–13 ECAC Hockey All-Conference First Team.

At the conclusion of his senior year with the Saints, Carey was signed as a free agent by the Arizona Coyotes to a one-year entry level deal on March 19, 2014. He then immediately joined the Coyotes' AHL affiliate, the Portland Pirates, on a try-out contract for the remainder of the 2013–14 season. In his first full professional season, he split the season between the Pirates the Coyotes ECHL affiliate, the Gwinnett Gladiators.

On the first day of 2016 Free Agency, the Philadelphia Flyers signed Carey to a two-year contract and reassigned him to their AHL affiliate, the Lehigh Valley Phantoms. He signed a contract extension with the Flyers on March 8, 2017.

In his third season with the Phantoms, Carey was selected for his first AHL All-Star Game alongside teammate Colin McDonald.

With his NHL contract concluded with the Flyers, Carey opted to return for a fourth season with the Lehigh Valley Phantoms, agreeing to a one-year AHL contract on July 1, 2019.

He paused during the season of 2020/21 and signed with the HC Pustertal Wölfe for the following season 2021/22.

Personal
Carey grew up in Hamilton, Ontario, to parents Debra and Alan Carey with younger brother Matt. Matt has also played for several professional hockey teams, including two games in the National Hockey League.

Career statistics

Awards and honours

References

External links

1990 births
Living people
Canadian ice hockey forwards
Gwinnett Gladiators players
Ice hockey people from Ontario
Lehigh Valley Phantoms players
Portland Pirates players
St. Lawrence Saints men's ice hockey players
Sportspeople from Hamilton, Ontario
Springfield Falcons players
AHCA Division I men's ice hockey All-Americans